The 1968 Maryland Terrapins football team represented the University of Maryland in the 1968 NCAA University Division football season. In their second and final season under head coach Bob Ward, the Terrapins compiled a 2–8 record (2–5 in conference), finished in seventh place in the Atlantic Coast Conference, and were outscored by their opponents 299 to 171. The team's statistical leaders included Alan Pastrana with 1,053 passing yards, Billy Lovett with 963 rushing yards, and Rick Carlson with 359 receiving yards.

Schedule

Roster

References

Maryland
Maryland Terrapins football seasons
Maryland Terrapins football